Moczydlnica Dworska  is a village in the administrative district of Gmina Wołów, within Wołów County, Lower Silesian Voivodeship, in south-western Poland. Prior to 1945 it was in Germany. To the east of the village is an abandoned graveyard in which Franz Karl Achard is buried.

References}

Moczydlnica Dworska